1938 in professional wrestling describes the year's events in the world of professional wrestling.

List of notable promotions 
Only one promotion held notable shows in 1938.

Calendar of notable shows

Championship changes

EMLL

Debuts
Debut date uncertain:
Al Costello
Cavernario Galindo
Maurice Tillet
April 3  Murciélago Velázquez

Births
Date Unknown  Argentina Apollo (died in 1984)
January 10  Steve Veidor 
January 15  Estrella Blanca (died in 2021)
January 21  Sandy Barr(died in 2007) 
January 23  Giant Baba(died in 1999)
April 22  Omar Atlas 
June 4   Wrestling Pro (died in 2019) 
June 19  Wahoo McDaniel(died in 2002)
July 25  Freddie Sweetan (died in 1974) 
August 2  Ángel Blanco(died in 1986)
August 13  Brian Maxine 
August 28  Jody Hamilton (died in 2021)
September 18  Billy Robinson(died in 2014)
September 29  Ann Casey (died in 2021) 
October 16  Bulldog Bob Brown (died in 1997) 
October 26  Ron Wright (died in 2015) 
November 3  The Beast(died in 2009)
November 19  Ted Turner
November 28  Ernie Ladd(died in 2007)

Deaths
June 10  Frank Speer (31)

References

 
professional wrestling